Jamia Arifia is an Islamic educational institute in Saiyed Sarawan.

It aims to fill up the gap between spirituality and intellectuality, orthodoxy and modernity, divine love and world affairs, Madrasa educational institute and Khanqah [spiritual center]. Daiye Islam Sheikh Abu Saeed foundated this institute in 1993. It runs under Khanqah-e-Arifia Welfare Society of Shah Safi Memorial Trust.

The institute is located in the village of Saiyed Sarawan in Kaushambi district, 600 km away from Delhi and 23 km from Allahabad.

About
Jamia is a religious institute and its syllabus is mainly based on traditional Islamic subjects, though it also teaches modern subjects like Science, Maths, Hindi and English languages and literature according to NCERT syllabus.

Affiliations
Al-Azhar University
UP Madarasa Board
Aligarh Muslim University
Jamia Millia Islamia

Departments

Primary Education
Jamia Arifia runs Primary Education Program, starting from class 1st to 5th in its campus and its branches also. It provides students a unique syllabus including religious subjects for giving them a strong base for future education and a promising career. This department is working extensively towards promotion of primary education in the area and playing pivotal role in the field of education and eradicating ignorance from our society.

Dars-e-Alia Nizamia
Dars-e-Alia Nizamia has two stages:
Moulviat (equivalent to 10th)
Alimiat (equivalent to 12th)

Maulviat (equivalent to 10th)
Maulviat is a specially designed five-year course that aims to impart religious education along with modern subjects up to high school level and offers different subjects like Arabic Grammar and Conjugation of Arabic Verbs, Islamic Jurisprudence and its Principles, Arabic Rhetoric, Qur'anic Interpretations, Prophetic Traditions and Hadith Sciences, Basic Urdu, Hindi, Persian and English Languages, Math and Social and Natural Sciences, etc.

On the completion of this course Jamia Arifia issues Maulviat Certificate which is regarded as equal to High School. After completing the Maulviat, students have the option of either continuing their religious education of senior secondary level or going to senior secondary school to study modern subjects.
Only 5th passed students are eligible for this course.

Alimiat (equivalent to 12th)
This is a two-year course, particularly, aims at teaching students higher level of Islamic sciences like Quranic Sciences, Hadith and its related Sciences, Jurisprudence and its Principles, Arabic Rhetoric and Arabic, Persian, Hindi and English Literatures along with modern subjects like Maths, Social and Natural Sciences, etc. On completion of this course, Jamia issues Alimiat Certificate which is regarded as equal to Intermediate. These students are eligible for admission in several subjects in different Indian universities like Aligarh Muslim University, Jamia Millia Islamia, I.F.L.U English & Foreign Languages University, Hyderabad and Maulana Azad National Urdu University, Hyderabad and Al-Azhar University Cairo, Egypt.
Only students having Maulviat or equivalent certificate from any Islamic institute are eligible to get admission in this course

Advanced Diploma in Dawa & Islamic Studies
This course is a specially designed one-year program. It aims to impart advanced religious education along with modern education and targets to prepare a group of individuals having expertise of subjects like Qur'anic interpretations, prophetic traditions and hadith sciences, Islamic jurisprudence, Tasawwuf, comparative study of religions, sects and ideologies, Arabic and English literature and translation along with basic Computer knowledge.

Admission seekers are required to hold Fazilat or equal degree from any Islamic institute. They have to clear admission test followed by an interview, and then on the basis of marks obtained in the test and interview candidates will be selected for admission to this course.

Some meritorious candidates are sponsored with a fellowship of Rs.1000. Their academic progress will be reviewed. On the basis of satisfactory academic report their fellowship will be renewed, but their fellowship will be cancelled if it was found unsatisfactory.

Tahifz-ul-Quran (the memorization of the Qura’n)
Jamia Arifia offers a special course "Tahfeez-ul-Quran" (Memorization of the Quran) Hifz-ul-Quran contests are also organized to encourage them and to check their memorization.

Tahfiz-ul-Quran Department has been active since its conception and playing a very important role in the field of Tahfeez-ul- Quran. It has produced a large number of Huffaaz (the scholars who have memorized the Quran completely) for the Muslim community. Right now a big number of the students are coming from different states. Primary Islamic and modern education are also provided to these students. To apply for this program child should know reading Quranic scripts correctly.

Quirat (The Recitation of Quran)
Jamia offers a certificate level course in Quirat (Correct Phonetic Recitation of Quran) which aims to train the students in reciting the Quran with correct pronunciation. All the candidates holding Hifz or Maulviat and Alimiat certificates are eligible to get admission to this course. All the students of Maulviat and Almiat are bound to attend Quirat classes.

Centres
Jamia Arifia runs two educational centres:
Maulana Azad National Urdu University MANUU Study Centre
National Council for Promotion of Urdu Language NCPUL Study Centre

References

External links 
Official website

High schools and secondary schools in Uttar Pradesh
Universities and colleges in Uttar Pradesh
Islamic universities and colleges in India
Kaushambi district
Madrasas in India